HMS Tarpon has been the name of more than one ship of the British Royal Navy, and may refer to:

 , a destroyer launched in 1917 and sold in 1927
 , a submarine launched in 1939 and sunk in 1940

Royal Navy ship names